Ya'ad (lit. Goal/Destiny) may refer to:

Ya'ad (political party), a defunct political party in Israel
Ya'ad – Civil Rights Movement, another, unrelated defunct political party in Israel
Ya'ad, Iran, a village in Khuzestan Province, Iran
Ya'ad, Israel, a moshav in northern Israel

See also
Yaad